Vår Frue Church ( / ) is a medieval parish church of the Church of Norway in Trondheim municipality in Trøndelag county, Norway. It is located in the downtown Midtbyen area of the city of Trondheim, just a few blocks north of the Nidaros Cathedral. It is one of the two churches for the Nidaros og Vår Frue parish which is part of the Nidaros domprosti (arch-deanery) in the Diocese of Nidaros. The gray, stone church was built in a long church design in the late 1100s using plans drawn up by Bjørn Sigvardsson. The church seats about 540 people.

History

The church was first constructed during the mid- to late-1100s by Bjørn Sigvardsson. It is a stone long church with features of both the Romanesque and Gothic architectural style. The date of construction is not known for sure, but the church celebrated its 800th anniversary in 2007.

The medieval church has seen its share of fires and restorations. In 1651, the church (and 90% of the city's buildings) was destroyed in a great city fire. Afterwards, only the walls remained. Nevertheless, some of the furniture was rescued, and gifts poured in afterwards that made it possible to rebuild and redecorate the church. The church burned again in 1681 and 1708.

In 1686, the church nave was expanded westward, with the masonry in the original eastern parts preserved. Afterwards, the total length of the church measured . From 1739 to 1742, the church underwent a large renovation project. During this time, a new tower with a flat roof was built on the west end. In 1779, the roof of the tower was changed to have a pyramid-shaped roof with a new spire on top. Throughout the 1700s, the church transitioned into having baroque decor.

In 1814 the church, along with over 300 others across Norway, served as an election church for elections to the Norwegian Constituent Assembly which wrote the Constitution of Norway.

Much of the Baroque and Rococo interior were removed in a restoration in the 1880s, led by architect Christian Christie (1832-1906), who also worked on the restoration of the Nidaros Cathedral. Christie made simplifications to the interior to bring it back partly to its former medieval appearance. From 1957 to 1959, a new refurbishment was conducted, led by architect John Egil Tverdahl (1890-1969). During this time, the church had its whitewashed exterior removed. The exterior masonry was knocked off so that the cobblestone stood bare as during the Medieval period.

The altarpiece was originally carved for Nidaros Cathedral by Heinrich Kühnemann (1711-1792) and dates to between 1742-1744. It was painted by J.N. Schavenius, and has figures cut by Jonas Granberg (1696-1776). In 1837 it was transferred to Vår Frue kirke. The pulpit was made in 1771 and it was restored 1957-1959. The baptismal font in the church is from 1898.

Media gallery

See also
List of churches in Nidaros

References

Related reading

External links
Vår Frue kirke Official Website
Vår Frue kirke (Trondheim) picture gallery

Churches in Trondheim
Churches in Trøndelag
Long churches in Norway
Stone churches in Norway
12th-century churches in Norway
12th-century establishments in Norway
Norwegian election church